The TVR Wedges are a series of wedge-shaped sports cars built by British specialist sports car manufacturer TVR between 1980 and 1991. There were 2-seat convertibles and 2-seater or 2+2 liftback coupés, with four-, six- and eight-cylinder engines from a variety of manufacturers. The name refers to their sharp-nosed angular shape, particular to the late seventies when they were designed.

The Tasmin name was used on most of the 200 and 280i TVRs, as well as for early 350i versions.

Wedges
Sports cars
Rear-wheel-drive vehicles